Lorenzo Buscarini (born 27 May 1991) is a Sammarinese former international footballer who played as a midfielder.

International career
Buscarini made his senior international debut on 12 October 2012, coming on as a substitute in a 5–0 away defeat to England.

References

Living people
1991 births
Sammarinese footballers
San Marino international footballers
San Marino youth international footballers
Association football midfielders
S.P. Cailungo players
S.S. Murata players
F.C. Domagnano players